Penn Township is a defunct township that was located in Philadelphia County, Pennsylvania. The township ceased to exist and was incorporated into the City of Philadelphia following the passage of the Act of Consolidation, 1854.

History
Penn Township was formed from the western portion of the Northern Liberties Township by order of the Court of Quarter Sessions in the year 1807. It was north of Vine Street, bounded on the east by Sixth Street to the intersection of the road to Germantown; thence by the same north by west to the foot of Logan's Hill; southwest to the township line road; along the same to a point a short distance above Manheim Lane; then over in a southwest direction to the Schuylkill River, and down the same to Vine Street. Its greatest length was four miles; its greatest width three miles; area, 7680 acres (31 km²).

The districts of Spring Garden and Penn were created out of this township, and it included portions of Rising Sun and Nicetown and Fort St. Davids, afterward called Falls Village. It was traversed in a northwestern direction by the Ridge Avenue, from Nine and Vine Streets, and northeastwardly from the Schulykill, between Fairmount and Lemon Hill, by Farmers’ Lane, which ran into the Germantown Road, and by Nicetown Lane, from the Ridge Road below the Falls, and over to Nicetown, Germantown and beyond.

Resources
Chronology of the Political Subdivisions of the County of Philadelphia, 1683-1854
Information courtesy of ushistory.org
Incorporated District, Boroughs, and Townships in the County of Philadelphia, 1854 By Rudolph J. Walther - excerpted from the book at the ushistory.org website

Municipalities in Philadelphia County prior to the Act of Consolidation, 1854
Populated places established in 1807
1854 disestablishments in Pennsylvania